Chienkosaurus ("Szechuan lizard") is a dubious genus of carnivorous theropod dinosaur from the Late Jurassic Kuangyuan Series of China. It was probably related to Szechuanosaurus.

Discovery and naming
The type species is Chienkosaurus ceratosauroides, named by Yang Zhongjian ("Chung Chien Young") in 1942 on the basis of IVPP V.237, which consists of four teeth. The species name means "Ceratosaurus-like" because Yang interpreted the teeth as being similar to Ceratosaurus. Three of the teeth catalogued under IVPP V.237 were recognized by Dong et al. (1983) as non-theropod and instead belonging to the mesoeucrocodylian Hsisosuchus, effectively restricting the holotype to the theropod tooth. Yang also referred to Chienkosaurus an ulna (IVPP V.193) and a caudal centrum (IVPP V.192). Holtz et al. (2004) designated Chienkosaurus as dubious in their chapter on basal Tetanurae, as did Wu et al. (2009).

References

Fossil taxa described in 1942
Late Jurassic dinosaurs of Asia
Prehistoric neotheropods
Paleontology in Sichuan
Taxa named by Yang Zhongjian
Nomina dubia